WQOS-LP (98.9 FM, "98.9 The Pit") was a radio station formerly licensed to serve Mount Pleasant, Michigan, United States. It aired a Classic rock music format. The station was owned by Children Saving Children Services.

The station was assigned the WQOS-LP call letters by the Federal Communications Commission (FCC) on January 9, 2004.

The station's license expired on October 1, 2012. On October 5, 2012, the FCC cancelled the station's license and deleted the WQOS-LP call sign from its database.

References

External links
 

QOS-LP
QOS-LP
Classic rock radio stations in the United States
Radio stations established in 2004
Defunct radio stations in the United States
Radio stations disestablished in 2012
2004 establishments in Michigan
2012 disestablishments in Michigan
QOS-LP